Latvia competed at the 1992 Summer Olympics in Barcelona, Spain.  It was the first time since 1936 that the nation had competed as an independent country at the Summer Olympic Games.  Latvian athletes competed for the Soviet Union (USSR) from 1952 to 1988. 34 competitors, 25 men and 9 women, took part in 31 events in 13 sports.

Medalists

Competitors
The following is the list of number of competitors in the Games.

Athletics

Men
Track & road events

Field events

Women
Track & road events

Field events

Boxing

Men

Canoeing

Slalom

Sprint
Men

Cycling

Five cyclists, all men, represented Latvia in 1992. Dainis Ozols won bronze in the road race.

Road

Track
Time trial

Sprint

Points race

Judo

Men

Modern pentathlon

Three male pentathletes represented Latvia in 1992.

Rowing

Men

Women

Sailing

Men

Women

Shooting

Men

Open

Swimming

Men

Tennis

Women

Weightlifting

Men

Wrestling

Men's freestyle

References

Nations at the 1992 Summer Olympics
1992
1992 in Latvian sport